The Free Social Democrats were a political party in Denmark.

History
The party was established in March 1920 by Emil Marott, who had been a Member of Parliament between 1903 and 1920 for the Social Democrats. In 1920 he had been expelled from the party because of diverging opinions on the Schleswig issue.

The party ran on a platform of returning Flensburg to Danish rule following the Schleswig Plebiscites, and contested all three Folketing elections held in 1920, but failed to win a seat.

References

Political parties established in 1920
Defunct socialist parties in Denmark
Social democratic parties in Europe
1920 establishments in Denmark
Political parties with year of disestablishment missing